The 1960 Masters Tournament was the 24th Masters Tournament, held April 7–10 at Augusta National Golf Club in Augusta, Georgia. Arnold Palmer birdied the final two holes to win by one stroke over runner-up Ken Venturi.

It was the second of Palmer's four Masters victories and the second of his seven major titles. Palmer, age 30, also won the U.S. Open in 1960 and was the runner-up at the British Open.

Jack Nicklaus, age 20 and the reigning U.S. Amateur champion, played in his second Masters. He made the cut for the first time at Augusta and tied for 13th place. Defending champion Art Wall Jr. did not play, due to a knee injury. The purse was $87,050 with a winner's share of $17,500.

Third place finisher Dow Finsterwald received a two-stroke penalty after the second round for violating a local rule, practice putting on the green following the conclusion of a hole, and lost the title by two strokes. The incident had occurred in the first round, and was self-reported after the second round after he was informed by his playing partner Billy Casper that it was not allowed. Instead of leading at 139 (−5), Finsterwald was tied with Ben Hogan and two others for second place after two rounds at 141, one stroke behind leader Palmer at 140.

Palmer was the sole leader after all four rounds and was the second wire-to-wire winner at the Masters, following Craig Wood in 1941. Subsequent wire-to-wire winners were Jack Nicklaus in 1972, Raymond Floyd in 1976, and Jordan Spieth in 2015.

The 36-hole cut rule was slightly modified this year to include all golfers in the top 40 plus ties or within 10 strokes of the lead. Previously the cut rule at the Masters (instituted in 1957) was top 40 plus ties. Three golfers made the cut at 150 (+6) who would not have made the cut under the previous rule.

The Par 3 contest was introduced this year, and three-time Masters champion Sam Snead won with a score of 23 (−4).

Field
1. Masters champions
Jack Burke Jr. (4,11), Jimmy Demaret, Doug Ford (4,9,11), Claude Harmon (9), Ben Hogan (2,3,4,9), Herman Keiser, Cary Middlecoff (2,8,10,11), Byron Nelson (2,4), Arnold Palmer (8,9), Henry Picard (4), Gene Sarazen (2,3,4), Horton Smith, Sam Snead (3,4,8,9,10,11), Craig Wood (2)
Ralph Guldahl (2) and Art Wall Jr. (8,11) did not play. Wall, the defending champion, had a knee injury.

The following categories only apply to Americans

2. U.S. Open champions
Tommy Bolt, Julius Boros (8,11), Billy Burke, Billy Casper (9), Chick Evans (5,a), Jack Fleck (8), Ed Furgol, Tony Manero, Lloyd Mangrum, Fred McLeod, Sam Parks Jr., Lew Worsham
Dick Mayer (8) did not play.

3. The Open champions
Jock Hutchison (4), Denny Shute (4)

4. PGA champions
Walter Burkemo (8), Dow Finsterwald (8,9,10,11), Vic Ghezzi, Chick Harbert (8), Chandler Harper (8), Lionel Hebert, Johnny Revolta, Bob Rosburg (9,10,11), Paul Runyan, Jim Turnesa

5. U.S. Amateur and Amateur champions
Deane Beman (6,a), Dick Chapman (a), Charles Coe (6,7,8,a), Jack Nicklaus (6,7,a), Robert Sweeny Jr. (a)

6. Members of the 1959 U.S. Walker Cup team
Tommy Aaron (a), William C. Campbell (a), Chuck Kocsis (8,a), Billy Joe Patton (8,a), Bud Taylor (a), Ward Wettlaufer (a)

Campbell and Kocsis were reserves for the team. Bill Hyndman (7,8) and Harvie Ward did not play.

7. 1959 U.S. Amateur quarter-finalists
Gene Andrews (a), David Goldman (a), Charles Harrison (a), Dudley Wysong (a)

Dick Yost did not play.

8. Top 24 players and ties from the 1959 Masters Tournament
Fred Hawkins (9), Jay Hebert (11), Ted Kroll (9), Gene Littler (9), Billy Maxwell, Ed Oliver, Bo Wininger

9. Top 16 players and ties from the 1959 U.S. Open
Dick Knight, Dave Marr, Mike Souchak (10,11), Ernie Vossler

10. Top eight players and ties from 1959 PGA Championship
Jerry Barber, Bob Goalby, Doug Sanders, Ken Venturi

11. Members of the U.S. 1959 Ryder Cup team

12. One player, either amateur or professional, not already qualified, selected by a ballot of ex-Masters champions
Mason Rudolph

13. One professional, not already qualified, selected by a ballot of ex-U.S. Open champions
George Bayer

14. One amateur, not already qualified, selected by a ballot of ex-U.S. Amateur champions
Richard Crawford (a)

15. Two players, not already qualified, from a points list based on finishes in the winter part of the 1960 PGA Tour
Don January, Dave Ragan

16. Foreign invitations
Bruce Crampton, Mário Gonzalez, Harold Henning, Denis Hutchinson, Stan Leonard (8), Ángel Miguel, Kel Nagle, Gary Player (3,8,9), Norman Von Nida, Harry Weetman

Numbers in brackets indicate categories that the player would have qualified under had they been American.

Round summaries

First round
Thursday, April 7, 1960

Source:
Finsterwald carded a 69, but incurred a two-stroke penalty for violating a local rule.

Second round
Friday, April 8, 1960

Source:

Third round
Saturday, April 9, 1960

Source:

Final round
Sunday, April 10, 1960

Final leaderboard

Sources:

Scorecard 

Cumulative tournament scores, relative to par
{|class="wikitable" span = 50 style="font-size:85%;
|-
|style="background: Pink;" width=10|
|Birdie
|style="background: PaleGreen;" width=10|
|Bogey
|style="background: Green;" width=10|
|Double bogey
|}

References

External links 
Masters.com – past winners and results
Augusta.com – 1960 Masters leaderboard and scorecards

1960
1960 in golf
1960 in American sports
1960 in sports in Georgia (U.S. state)
April 1960 sports events in the United States